James Steven Davis (born June 12, 1957 in Los Angeles, California) is a former American football cornerback with the Los Angeles Raiders of the National Football League. He attended Southern University.

External links
NFL.com player page

1957 births
Living people
Players of American football from Los Angeles
American football cornerbacks
Southern Jaguars football players
Los Angeles Raiders players